This is a list of surviving pure landscapes by Albrecht Altdorfer (–1538), German painter and printmaker who produced the first independent landscapes since antiquity.

Paintings

Albrecht Altdorfer produced the very first pure landscapes in the history of European art.

Only five surviving landscape paintings are generally accepted to have been painted by Altdorfer. Two of them,  one in Munich (30.5 × 22.2 cm) and one in London (41.2 × 35.5 cm), were painted in oils on parchment glued on wood. The other three, in Berlin, Erlangen, and Rotterdan, all just over 20 × 13 cm, were painted in watercolour and gouache on paper. All five are signed with Altdorfer's monogram AA (see below). The painting in Rotterdam is also dated 1522 by the artist.

Tokyo Fuji Art Museum owns an unsigned 53.1 × 45.1 cm oil-on-panel painting of a mountain range which it also attributes to Altdorfer.

Etchings

Altdorfer's landscape etchings, of which nine are known, are the first European prints with such subject.

Of particular interest is a group of ten delicately hand-coloured impressions of the etchings (8 in Albertina, 1 in Veste Coburg, and 1 in the British Museum). These are thought to have been painted in the artist's studio, perhaps even by Altdorfer himself (it was, in fact, his father's trade). An additional hand-coloured impression of somewhat inferior quality survives in the Rijksmuseum.

All the etchings are signed with Altdorfer's monogram (see below).

Engravings

Drawings

See also
 Albrecht Altdorfer
 Landscape painting

Notes

References
  google books preview
  google books preview

External links
 

Albrecht Altdorfer
Altdorfer
Collections of the Albertina, Vienna